Crangonyctidae is a family of cave-dwelling freshwater amphipod crustaceans. It contains the following genera:
Amurocrangonyx Sidorov & Holsinger, 2007 
Bactrurus Hay, 1902
Crangonyx Bate, 1859
Lyurella Derzhavin, 1939
† Palaeogammarus Zaddach, 1864
Stygobromus Cope, 1872
Stygonyx Bousfield & Holsinger, 1989

References

Gammaridea
Crustacean families